Columbia, Missouri held an election on April 5, 2022, concurrently with elections for the city council members for wards 3 and 4.

Background 
During a community briefing on September 17, 2021, incumbent mayor Brian Treece announced he would not seek re-election for a third term. Citing the "level of responsibility and the burden" of his job during the COVID-19 pandemic, Mayor Treece said in his statement "The last 18 months have been no easy decisions. There's no playbook on handling a pandemic. That takes its toll."

Petition forms for candidates were made available to pick up from the office of the City Clerk beginning on October 19, 2021. Candidate petition filings for the municipal elections opened on October 26 and closed on January 11, 2022 at 5 pm. Candidates running for mayor required the valid signatures of at least 100 registered Columbia voters.

Candidates

Withdrew before the election

Results

References 

Columbia
21st century in Columbia, Missouri
Columbia
Non-partisan elections
Mayoral elections in Columbia, Missouri